The 1986 Tennessee Volunteers football team (variously "Tennessee" or the "Vols") represented the University of Tennessee in the 1986 NCAA Division I-A football season. Playing as a member of the Southeastern Conference (SEC), the team was led by head coach Johnny Majors, in his tenth year, and played their home games at Neyland Stadium in Knoxville, Tennessee. They finished the season with a record of seven wins and five losses (7–5 overall, 3–3 in the SEC) and with a victory over Minnesota in the Liberty Bowl. The Volunteers offense scored 293 points while the defense allowed 249 points.

Schedule

Game summaries

vs. Minnesota (Liberty Bowl)

Team players drafted into the NFL

Reference:

References

Tennessee
Tennessee Volunteers football seasons
Liberty Bowl champion seasons
Tennessee Volunteers football